Jama Masjid (originally named as Safa Masjid) is a five century old Mosque in Golconda, Hyderabad, India. It was constructed in 1518 by the first Qutb Shahi ruler Sultan Quli Qutb Shah - while he was governor of the Bahmani Sultanate in Telangana.

History

In 1518 (924 Hijri) Sultan Quli Qutb Shah (later the first Qutb Shahi ruler) a governor of Telangana under the Bahmani sultan Mahmood Shah Bahmani II rebuilt the mud-fort of Golconda and named the city as Muhammad Nagar, During the same year the mosque was constructed as "Safa Masjid" later to be known as Jama Masjid, Golconda. In the year 1543, Sultan Quli was assassinated in this mosque while in prayers by Mir Mahmud Hamadani, Quiladar of Golconda fort who was instigated by heir apparent Jamsheed Quli Qutb Shah son of Sultan Quli.

Architecture
The mosque and Golconda Fort were planned to be a larger planned city named Mohammed Nagar-( a new name given to Golconda by Sultan Quli Qutb Shah). It is the only mosque constructed during Bahmani reign in the form of Bahmani style of architecture in Hyderabad.The mosque consist of single dome over the entrance gateway, courtyard floor is paved with granite slabs, a large hall divided into four aisles and five arches.

References

Further reading
Towns and Cities of Medieval India: A Brief Survey, by Aniruddha Ray (2016)

Mosques in Hyderabad, India
Bahmani architecture